Patrick Joseph O'Grady (15 September 1872 – 28 May 1899) was an Australian rules footballer who played with St Kilda in the Victorian Football League (VFL).

References

External links 

1872 births
1899 deaths
VFL/AFL players born outside Australia
Australian rules footballers from Victoria (Australia)
St Kilda Football Club players